Elections to Lancaster City Council took place on 3 May 2007.  The whole council was up for election and in remained in No Overall Control with Labour and the Liberal Democrats losing seats to the Greens and Conservatives.

Following the election, the composition of the council was as follows:

Election result

|- style="background-color:#F6F6F6"
| colspan="7" style="text-align: right; margin-right: 0.5em" | Turnout
| style="text-align: right; margin-right: 0.5em" | 36
| style="text-align: right; margin-right: 0.5em" | 36,220
| style="text-align: right; margin-right: 0.5em" | 
|-

Ward results

Bare

Bolton-Le-Sands

Bulk

Carnforth

Castle

Duke's

Ellel

Halton-with-Aughton

Harbour

Heysham Central

Heysham North

Heysham South

John O'Gaunt

Kellet

Lower Lune Valley

Overton

Poulton

Scotforth East

Scotforth West

Silverdale

Skerton East

Skerton West

Slyne-with-Hest

Torrisholme

University

Upper Lune Valley

Warton

Westgate

External links
Election results on Lancaster Council site

Lancaster
2007
2000s in Lancashire